The 2016–2017 Bikarkeppni kvenna was the 43rd edition of the Icelandic Women's Basketball Cup, won by Keflavík against Skallagrímur. The competition was managed by the Icelandic Basketball Federation and the final four was held in Reykjavík, in the Laugardalshöll in February 2018. Ariana Moorer was named the Cup Finals MVP after scoring 29 points and grabbing 19 rebounds.

Participating teams
Twelve teams signed up for the Cup tournament.

Bracket

Cup Finals MVP

References

External links
2016–2017 Tournament results

Women's Cup